The Baltika Group is an Estonian fashion brandhouse and retailer that operates Monton, Mosaic, Baltman, Bastion and Ivo Nikkolo retail concepts. Since May 2013, Baltika also represents Blue Inc London fashion brand in the Baltics. Group brands are represented in Estonia, Latvia, Lithuania, Russia, Belarus, Ukraine, Serbia and Germany. Baltika is listed in the Tallinn Stock Exchange.

The company was established in 1928 in Tallinn as a raincoats manufacturer and bore the name Gentleman. In 1959, the company was restructured and given the name Baltika. The company was one of the first privatized in Estonia in the beginning of 1990's.

In the years 1946–1960, it was called the Tallinn Sewing Factory, in the years 1960–1970, the Baltika Sewing Factory, and in the years 1970–1991, the Baltika Sewing Production Team.

References

External links

Clothing companies of Estonia
Companies based in Tallinn
Clothing companies established in 1928
1928 establishments in Estonia
Companies listed on Nasdaq Tallinn
Manufacturing companies of the Soviet Union
Companies nationalised by the Soviet Union